In April 2010, the South African Minister of Transport proposed a Johannesburg–Durban high-speed rail system. There are concerns about the cost and engineering difficulty of the project, which would have to cross the Drakensberg mountains. but the minister repeated proposals in June 2010. The project is expected to cost U$30 billion, but there are hopes that alternative funding sources will be available. China Railway Group says it is in talks with the South African government for construction contracts.

Maps 
 UN Map

See also 
 Rail transport in South Africa
 High-speed rail in South Africa
 Durban
 Johannesburg
 Metrorail (South Africa)

References

Proposed transport infrastructure in South Africa
Rail transport in South Africa